(Elistan) Patrick Glover  (born 1 February 1944) was the Bishop of Bloemfontein (from 2003, styled 'of the Free State'), from 1997 until his retirement in 2012.

He was educated at Keble College, Oxford, and ordained in 1969. He began his career  with curacies at St Peter’s Church, Krugersdorp, and  St Martin’s-in-Veld, Johannesburg. After this he was rector of St Catherine’s, Johannesburg, and then of St George’s, in the same city, before becoming dean of Bloemfontein in 1987. In 1994 he became a suffragan bishop and three years later a diocesan.

Awards 
Appointed as chaplain to the Venerable Order of St. John.

References 

1944 births
Alumni of Keble College, Oxford
Deans of Bloemfontein
21st-century Anglican Church of Southern Africa bishops
Anglican bishops of Bloemfontein
Living people